The following lists the top 25 singles of 2017 in Australia from the Australian Recording Industry Association (ARIA) end-of-year singles chart.

Ed Sheeran’s single "Shape of You", was the highest selling single in Australia in 2017 with a sales accreditation of nine times platinum. It spent fifteen weeks at number one.

References 

Australian record charts
2017 in Australian music
Australia Top 25 Singles